Uspenovka may refer to:

 Uspenovka, Kazakhstan
 Uspenovka, former name for Jerge-Tal, Jalal-Abad, Kyrgyzstan
in Russia:
Uspenovka, Altai Krai
Uspenovka, Belogorsky District, Amur Oblast, a village in Belogorsky District
Uspenovka, Bureysky District, Amur Oblast, a village in Bureysky District
Uspenovka, Ivanovsky District, Amur Oblast, a village in Ivanovsky District
Uspenovka, Zavitinsky District, Amur Oblast, a village in Zavitinsky District
Uspenovka, Republic of Bashkortostan